Liu Fei may refer to:

 Liu Fei, Prince of Qi
 Liu Fei, Prince of Jiangdu
 Liu Fei (general) (1905–1984), People's Liberation Army lieutenant general
 Liu Fei (politician), Chinese politician